Li Pingqian (1902 – 18 November 1984) was a Chinese filmmaker who directed over 90 films in his career in mainland China and Hong Kong. He is probably best known for his works with actresses Gong Qiuxia and Xia Meng, who each starred in more than a dozen of his films. Moreover, his 1964 Huangmei opera film Three Charming Smiles starring Chen Sisi was a huge hit in China.

Filmography

As actor

As director

In popular culture
In the 2008 Chinese TV series Zhao Dan (赵丹), Li Pingqian is portrayed by actor Meng Jun (孟俊).

External links

1902 births
1984 deaths
Hong Kong film directors
Film directors from Zhejiang
Screenwriters from Zhejiang
Chinese male silent film actors
Male actors from Hangzhou
Writers from Hangzhou
Chinese silent film directors
20th-century screenwriters